Francis Anthony Baring Pollen, FRIBA  (7 December 1926 – 4 November 1987) was an English architect who designed, amongst other significant buildings, Worth Abbey in West Sussex.

He was born in London on 7 December 1926 and educated at Downside School in Somerset, and Trinity College, Cambridge. In 1950 he married Thérèse Sheridan: they had one son and four daughters. In 1954 he began working for Lionel Brett, becoming his partner in  1959. His first commission was a Carmelite convent at Presteigne, Powys. This was followed by other churches, including St John Bosco's at Woodley, and St Peter's, Marlow, both in Berkshire. He also worked at Downside Abbey, for Barclays Bank and on private houses before going solo in 1971.

Pollen is regarded as one of the key British architects of the Roman Catholic Liturgical Movement in the UK that resulted in a large number of new modernist Catholic churches being built, and other churches being reordered. A group of architects that included Gillespie, Kidd & Coia, Gerard Goalen, Desmond Williams, Austin Winkley and Pollen utilised contemporary design and construction methods to deliver the 'noble simplicity' required by Vatican II.    

His daughter Clare has been Countess of Oxford & Asquith since her husband assumed the earldom in 2014.

Pollen died on 4 November 1987.

References

Further reading
 

1926 births
1987 deaths
Architects from London
20th-century English architects
Fellows of the Royal Institute of British Architects
Alumni of Trinity College, Cambridge
People educated at Downside School
Architects of the Liturgical Movement